Trevor Edward Howard (born 2 June 1949) is a former professional footballer who played as a midfielder or right-back.

Howard began his career with Norwich City, with whom he won the Second Division championship in 1972. He became the first substitute to score for the club when he scored the winner against Hull City on 26 December 1968. After making 156 appearances and scoring 19 goals for Norwich, he went on to play for AFC Bournemouth and Cambridge United. As part of the deal for his transfer to Bourmeounth in 1974, Tony Powell moved in the opposite direction to join Norwich.

Honours
 Second Division Championship 1971-72

References

Bibliography

1949 births
Living people
Sportspeople from King's Lynn
English footballers
Association football midfielders
Association football fullbacks
Norwich City F.C. players
AFC Bournemouth players
Cambridge United F.C. players